The Twenty-fourth Amendment may refer to:

 Twenty-fourth Amendment of the Constitution of India (1971)
 Twenty-fourth Amendment of the Constitution Bill 2001 (Ireland)
 Twenty-fourth Amendment to the Constitution of Pakistan (2017)
 Twenty-fourth Amendment to the United States Constitution (1964)